= Saleh Allahyar =

Qatari footballer (born 1980)

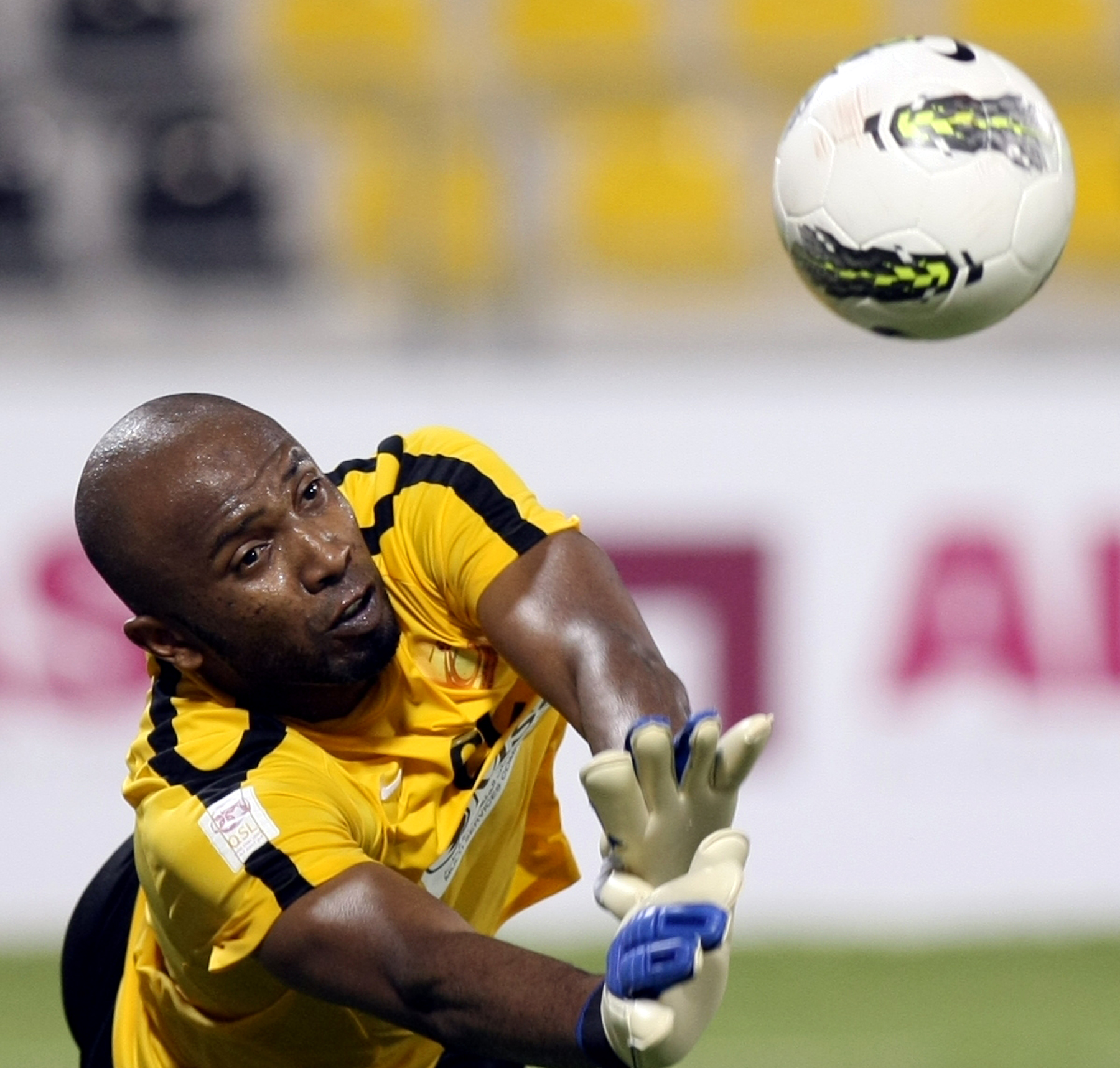

Personal information
- Full name: Saleh Allahyar
- Date of birth: 26 November 1980 (age 45)
- Place of birth: Qatar
- Position: Goalkeeper

Senior career*
Years	Team	Apps	(Gls)
2002–2010	Al-Shamal		
2010–2013	Umm Salal		
2013–2016	Al-Wakra		
- * Club domestic league appearances and goals

Saleh Allahyar (Arabic:صالح اللهيار) (born 26 November 1980) is a retired Qatari who was a footballer.
